Deborah Drisana Jack (born 1970) is a Caribbean visual artist and poet. Raised on the island of Saint Martin, her art is both conceptual and interdisciplinary, employing installation, photography, and film to explore various themes. She has published two poetry collections. Jack graduated from the State University of New York at Buffalo and teaches art at New Jersey City University.

Early life and education
Jack was born in 1970 in Rotterdam. She grew up in Sint Maarten, the Dutch half of the island of Saint Martin in the Caribbean.

In the 1990s, Jack worked in an art gallery and was among the founding partners of the Philipsburg-based AXUM. She earned her MFA in 2002 from the State University of New York at Buffalo.

Art career
Jack's art is conceptual, exploring themes related to the African diaspora, memory and time. Her works are multidisciplinary, using installation, photography, and film. She frequently uses motifs such as the ocean, salt, slavery, the Middle Passage, and Atlantic hurricanes.

Salt plays a crucial role in much of Jack's work. Historically, salt mining in Saint Martin was accomplished through slave labour. Beginning in the early 2000s, Jack's art has incorporated salt as a motif, connecting members of the African diaspora through the ocean to their roots in Africa. For her 2002 Foremothers series, she used rock salt in portraits of her paternal grandmother.

Jack had a summer residency at Big Orbit Gallery in 2004 and her installation SHORE debuted there on September 11. She layered the gallery floors with five tons of brown and white salt which visitors trod on. The installation employed a 40-foot by 20-foot reflecting pool at the edge of the floor and used projected video, sound, and nylon sails to evoke themes related to memory, the history of Saint Martin, slavery, and the Middle Passage.

After a purchaser of one of the paintings from Jack's A/Salting Series informed her the artwork had been growing, she visited the painting to discover that it had been recently moved and a change in air moisture had caused new crystallization of the salts.

Jack published the poetry collection The Rainy Season in 1997. She followed with another collection in 2006 entitled skin.

A 20-year retrospective of Jack's work, Deborah Jack: 20 Years, was held at Pen + Brush in 2021. Jack gave the keynote address at the 2021 St. Martin Book Fair. She also received the Presidents Award at the book fair.

Jack holds an assistant professorship at New Jersey City University where she teaches art.

Selected exhibitions
Deborah Jack: 20 Years (2021)
Deborah Jack: somewhere in the tangle of limbs and roots   (2007)

References

External links
Artist website

1970 births
Living people
Sint Maarten people
New Jersey City University faculty
University at Buffalo alumni
Installation artists
Video artists
Artists from Rotterdam
Conceptual artists
Women conceptual artists
Women installation artists